Little Star may refer to:

Music
 "Little Star" (The Elegants song), 1958
 "Little Star" (Chuck Berry song), a 1961 song by Chuck Berry from the album New Juke Box Hits
 "Little Star" (Stina Nordenstam song), a 1994 song by Stina Nordenstam from the album And She Closed Her Eyes
 "Little Star" (Madonna song), 1998
Little Star Records, an independent label that existed from 1961 to 1963

Other uses
 Little Star (TV series), a 2010 Filipino drama series 
 Little Star (novel), a 2010 novel by John Ajvide Lindqvist
 Little Star Foundation, a charity established by Andrea Jaeger
 Little Star (comic), a British nursery comic which launched in 1972 that was comparable to Bimbo
 Little Star, a children's TV show that aired on Treehouse TV in the 1990s
Little Star Journal, a magazine of poetry and prose established in 2009